Tiit Toomsalu (born 21 November 1949) is an Estonian politician who was the leader of the Estonian Left Party from 1996 to 2004.

In 1968 he graduated from Tallinn Secondary School No. 2 (now the Tallinn Secondary School of Science). In 1974, he graduated from the University of Tartu with a degree in law.

From 1999 to 2003, he was a member of the Riigikogu as part of the Estonian United People's Party. From 1996 to 2004, he was chairman of the Estonian Left Party
(now merged into the Estonian United Left Party). Toomsalu was considered one of the more prominent left-wing politicians in Estonia after independence while active in political office. During his time in the Riigikogu, where he was a member of the Constitutional law committee, he was infamous for his prolonged questions speeches and numerous proposed amendments to the constitution. In direct response to Toomsalu, the Riigikogu passed a regulation that excluded any amendments and initiatives if it was supported by only one member of the Riigikogu. He was also against joining NATO and the European Union. According to a commercial register, he had been a member of the party since 1991. In 2010, the party was liquidated by decision of the board, due to its merger with the Constitution Party to form the Estonian United Left Party.

Toomsalu is married and has two children.

References

1949 births
Living people
Members of the Riigikogu, 1999–2003
University of Tartu alumni
20th-century Estonian politicians
21st-century Estonian politicians